Angelokastro or Angelokastron may refer to:

Angelokastro, Aetolia-Acarnania, a municipality in Greece
Angelokastro, Corinthia, a settlement in Corinthia
Angelokastro (Corfu), a Byzantine castle in Corfu, Greece
Choma (fortress), a Byzantine fortress in Phrygia, also known as Angelokastron after 1193